CIVC may refer to:

 Le Comité Interprofessionnel du vin de Champagne, the organisation of champagne producers
 CIVC-TV 45, a TV channel in the network Télé-Québec in Trois-Rivières, Canada
 CIVC Partners, a private equity firm